Nic Martin, known professionally as UNO Stereo, is an Australian record producer, songwriter and artist based in Melbourne. He has produced ARIA Music Award winning and APRA Award nominated records.

Martin went from bedroom-beatmaking at age 11 to recording and producing rap records at age 18 with long-time friend and collaborator Blessed (FKA Miracle). He worked his way into the music industry by teaming up with local talent and forming a group then known as Dream Big Music. His career progressed further with platinum-certified records from Timomatic and Justice Crew and producing for Jay Sean and Busta Rhymes, UNO Stereo worked on projects with prominent Australian rappers such as Seth Sentry's album Strange New Past, which won the ARIA Music Award for Best Urban Album, and Bliss n Eso's platinum-certified single "Moments". He has also worked with Illy, Horrorshow, Tuka, Urthboy and Drapht.

Since then, he has gone on to co-produce Khalid's Grammy nominated debut studio album American Teen and 360's comeback album Vintage Modern. He then dropped his own UNO Stereo collaborations, whilst his single "Got U" was streamed over two million times. He produced British artist Wiley's "Over It" and American rapper Wale's "Debbie", dropped a collaborative single with Canada's Maurice Moore ("Just 2"), and produced the ARIA Music Award-winning single "Miss Shiney" for neo soul musician Kaiit.

Awards and nominations
 Won – 2019 ARIA Music Awards for Best Soul/R&B Release (Kaiit's "Miss Shiney")
 Nominated − 2018 Grammy Awards for Best Urban Contemporary Album (Khalid's American Teen)
 Nominated – 2018 APRA Awards for Urban Work of the Year (Bliss n Eso feat. Gavin James' "Moments")
 Won – 2015 ARIA Awards for Best Urban Album (Seth Sentry's Strange New Past)

Discography

Solo
Innervisions – Single, 2013
Got U (feat. Majerle) – Single, 2016
Just 2 (feat. Maurice Moore) – Single, 2017
KEEP UP (feat. Mari and Majerle) – Single, 2017
Episodes, Vol. 1 – Mixtape, 2018
My Way (feat. Jordan Dennis) – Single, 2018

Selected production and co-writes

References

External links 
 Nic Martin on AllMusic

Australian record producers
Living people
Year of birth missing (living people)